Malditas sean las mujeres, also known as Malditas serán las mujeres ("Cursed be the Women") is a 1936 Mexican film. It stars Adriana Lamar.

Cast
 Adriana Lamar - Julia de Ambrosaliet
 Ramón Pereda - Alejandro del Valle
 Polo Ortín - Francisco, criado 
 Manuel Noriega - Señor de Velasco
 René Cardona - Conde Osvaldo de Valdemar
 Juan José Martínez Casado - Gilberto de Velasco
 Sara García - Señora de Ambrosaliet
 Miguel Arenas - Ernesto
 Joaquín Coss - Director de escuela
 Miguel Wimer - Losange
 Dolores Camarillo - María, sirvienta
 Paco Martínez - Señor de Ambrosaliet
 Pepe Martínez - Secretario

External links
 

1936 films
1930s Spanish-language films
Mexican black-and-white films
Mexican drama films
1936 drama films
1930s Mexican films